Balashov is a town in Saratov Oblast, Russia, located on the Khopyor River. Population:  It was previously known as Balashovo (until 1780).

History
It has been known as the selo of Balashovo since the end of the 18th century. In 1780, it was granted town status and became known as Balashov.

Between 1954 and 1957, it was capital of the Balashov Oblast of Russian SFSR.

Administrative and municipal status
Within the framework of administrative divisions, Balashov serves as the administrative center of Balashovsky District, even though it is not a part of it. As an administrative division, it is incorporated separately as Balashov Town Under Oblast Jurisdiction—an administrative unit with the status equal to that of the districts. As a municipal division, Balashov Town Under Oblast Jurisdiction is incorporated within Balashovsky Municipal District as Balashov Urban Settlement.

Military
It was home to the Balashov air base.

Climate
Balashov has a humid continental climate (Köppen climate classification Dfb) with long cold winters and warm, often hot summers.

Notable people 
 Denis Baryshnikov, footballer
 Yuri Garnaev, test-pilot
 Anatoly Vlasov, theoretical physicist prominent in the fields of statistical mechanics, kinetics, and especially in plasma physics.

References

Notes

Sources

External links
Official website of Balashov 
Directory of organizations in Balashov 

Cities and towns in Saratov Oblast
Balashovsky Uyezd